INS Udaygiri (F35) was a  of the Indian Navy. Udaygiri was commissioned into the Navy on 18 February 1976. She was decommissioned on 24 August 2007.

Operations
The ship took part in the fleet review held in UK commemorating the Silver Jubilee of Elizabeth II in 1977.

References

Nilgiri-class frigates
Frigates of the Indian Navy
1972 ships